Louis Richarno Colin (born 17 July 1987 in Vacoas-Phoenix, Mauritius) is a Mauritian boxer best known to be All Africa champ 2011.

He qualified for the 2008 Olympics at junior welterweight at the 2nd AIBA African 2008 Olympic Qualifying Tournament. At Beijing he upset Myke Carvalho but was defeated by Gennady Kovalev from Russia in the round of 16.(Results)

He has competed in the 2010 Commonwealth Games under the name of Louis Colin. He was the flag carrier for Mauritius in the opening ceremony. He won bronze in the Light Welterweight category in Boxing.

At the 2012 African Boxing Olympic Qualification Tournament he also qualified for the 2012 London Olympics.  At London he beat Abdelhak Aatakni in the first round before losing to Uranchimegiin Mönkh-Erdene in the second round.

At the 2020 Summer Olympics, he competed in the men's lightweight event.

Commonwealth results

2010 (as Light Welterweight) (as Louis Colin)
 Defeated Chris Jenkins (Wales) 7–0
 Defeated Luke Woods (Australia) 8–3
 Defeated Philip Bowes (Jamaica) 6–0
 Lost to Bradley Saunders (England) 7–10

References

External links
 
 Qualifier
 Richarno Colin's profile at ESPN Sports
 2010 Commonwealth Games Bio

1987 births
Living people
Light-welterweight boxers
Boxers at the 2008 Summer Olympics
Boxers at the 2012 Summer Olympics
Olympic boxers of Mauritius
Boxers at the 2010 Commonwealth Games
Commonwealth Games bronze medallists for Mauritius
Commonwealth Games silver medallists for Mauritius
Boxers at the 2014 Commonwealth Games
Boxers at the 2022 Commonwealth Games
Mauritian male boxers
Commonwealth Games medallists in boxing
African Games gold medalists for Mauritius
African Games medalists in boxing
Competitors at the 2011 All-Africa Games
Competitors at the 2019 African Games
People from Plaines Wilhems District
Boxers at the 2020 Summer Olympics
Medallists at the 2010 Commonwealth Games
Medallists at the 2022 Commonwealth Games